The 2014–2015 UCI Track Cycling World Cup was a multi-race tournament over a track cycling season. It was the 23rd series of the UCI Track Cycling World Cup organised by the Union Cycliste Internationale. The series ran from 8 November 2014 to 18 January 2015 and consisted of three rounds in Guadalajara, London, and Cali.

Series 
The 2014–2015 UCI Track Cycling World Cup consisted of three rounds, in Guadalajara (Mexico) on 8–9 November 2014, London (United Kingdom) on 5–7 December 2014, and Cali (Colombia) on 17–18 January 2015.

Overall team standings
Overall team standings are calculated based on total number of points gained by the team's riders in each event. The top ten teams after the third and final round are listed below:

Results

Men

Women

References

External links
Official website
Tissot Timing Results
AllSportDB.com competition page

World Cup Classics
World Cup Classics
UCI Track Cycling World Cup